The Ketzos HaChoshen is the major writing by Rabbi Aryeh Leib Heller (1745–1812)
on the basis of which he is known as "The Ketzos". The first printing was in Lviv

Importance
The Ketzos HaChoshen (Ends of the Breastplate) is a halachic work which explains difficult passages in the Shulchan Aruch, Choshen Mishpat (which deals mainly with business and financial laws such as contracts, witnesses etc.) with novel ideas proposed by Rabbi Aryeh Leib.

Familiarity with this work is considered mandatory for any Torah scholar or Dayan. It is customarily studied in conjunction with Nesivot HaMishpat, written by Rav Yaakov Lorberbaum, who often controverted Rabbi Heller's conclusions on many points.

The Ketzos's sefer is often published in tandem with his brother Yehuda Heller's book, Kuntras Ha'Sfeikos as a two-volume set.

References

Rabbinic legal texts and responsa
Sifrei Kodesh